Michael Sio (born 16 May 1993) is a Samoa international rugby league footballer who was most recently contracted to Wakefield Trinity (Heritage № 1360) in the Super League.

Early life
Sio was born in Auckland, New Zealand.

He attended St. Paul's College, where he was a prefect.

Playing career
Sio played junior league for the Marist Saints before he was signed by the New Zealand Warriors. He played for the Junior Warriors in the Holden Cup, captaining the side in 2013. At the end of the 2013 season he was awarded the Sonny Fai Medal as the Junior Warriors' player of the year.

He played for the New Zealand Residents in 2011. Sio was called up to the Samoan squad for the 2013 World Cup to replace Masada Iosefa.

In May 2014, Michael played for Samoa in the 2014 Pacific International. On 7 October 2014, Sio was selected in the Samoan side for the 2014 Four Nations series. He came in as a late replacement to play in the 2015 Polynesian Cup test-match.

Sio joined the Mackay Cutters in the Queensland Cup for the 2015 season. However, on 22 June 2015, he signed a -year contract with Super League club Wakefield Trinity Wildcats. He left the club at the end of the 2017 season.

References

External links
Wakefield Trinity profile

1993 births
Living people
Auckland rugby league team players
Mackay Cutters players
Marist Saints players
New Zealand sportspeople of Samoan descent
New Zealand rugby league players
People educated at St Paul's College, Auckland
Rugby league hookers
Rugby league second-rows
Samoa national rugby league team players
Wakefield Trinity players